Ciampa is a genus of moths in the family Geometridae.

Species
 Ciampa arietaria (Guenée, 1857)
 Ciampa chordota (Meyrick, 1890)
 Ciampa heteromorpha (Lower, 1901)
 Ciampa melanostrepta (Lower, 1893)

References
 Ciampa at Markku Savela's Lepidoptera and Some Other Life Forms
 Natural History Museum Lepidoptera genus database

Nacophorini
Geometridae genera